The San Pedro y San Pablo River is a river of Mexico. It is a distributary of the Usumacinta River. It branches from the lower Usumacinta and flows northwards, emptying into Atasta and Pom lagoons which are connected to Laguna de Términos, which in turn connects to the Gulf of Mexico.

See also
List of rivers of Mexico

References

Atlas of Mexico, 1975 (http://www.lib.utexas.edu/maps/atlas_mexico/river_basins.jpg).
The Prentice Hall American World Atlas, 1984.
Rand McNally, The New International Atlas, 1993.

Rivers of Mexico
Usumacinta River
Gulf Coast of Mexico